Dallas Mill was a manufacturer of cotton sheeting in Huntsville, Alabama, United States. The first of four major textile mills in Huntsville, the mill operated from 1891 until 1949, before it was converted for use as a warehouse in 1955 and burned in 1991. The village, constructed to house workers and their families, was incorporated into the city in 1955. The mill and its mill village are listed on the National Register of Historic Places.

History
In the 1880s, business leaders in Huntsville sought to increase the industrial presence in what was otherwise a small town of around 5,000 residents. The North Alabama Improvement Company was formed March 17, 1886, and promoted investment in the city to Northeastern businesses. In 1890 Trevanion Barlow Dallas, a Nashville mill executive, agreed to construct a cotton mill in Huntsville.  Early stockholders in the mill included Dallas, the North Alabama Improvement Company, Michael O'Shaughnessy (another Nashville industrialist who moved to Huntsville and constructed a home named Kildare, also listed on the NRHP), and Northern industrialists including the Milliken family, owners of textile giant Deering Milliken.  The mill was incorporated in 1891 and began operation on November 16, 1892.

When the mill opened, it contained 25,000 spindles, 704 looms, and employed 516 workers, making it one of the South's largest cotton mills.  Just eight years later, the mill was doubled in size, to 50,000 spindles, 1,541 looms, 1,200 workers, and 300,000 square feet.  The capital for the expansion came primarily from Milliken and Albert W. Green, who became the largest shareholders in the mill.  The mill manufactured bleached and brown shirting and sheeting, and consumed approximately 20,000 bales of locally-grown cotton annually.

In the summer of 1900, a female worker was allegedly raped by a Black man named Elijah Clark. The entire workforce of the mill left work, went to the local jail and lynched in front of six thousand spectators. The mill later paid for the damage done to the Huntsville Jail by their workers.

The mill remained one of the largest employers in the area until the 1930s, when labor unrest began to disrupt all of Huntsville's cotton mills. From July 17 until September 22, 1934, a strike by the United Textile Workers of America brought violence to Huntsville.  The mill was crippled by another strike in 1947; at the time of the strike, the mill employed 700 workers, but had dwindled to only 300 two years later. The mill operated on a partial basis until July 1949. Its assets were sold at auction, and the building was purchased by two Boaz businessmen for $175,000. They leased it to the Genesco Shoe Company, who used it as a distribution warehouse from 1955 until 1987. The mill was used as a warehouse for a real estate developer until the building was destroyed by a fire on July 24, 1991.

Architecture
The main mill building was designed by Providence, Rhode Island architectural firm Lockwood, Greene & Co. in the Italianate style. A low-pitched gable roof projected two feet from the sides. Two square brick towers with pyramidal roofs housed water tanks and projected above the roof. Two brick chimneys from the boiler room sat behind the main building.

Each of the five stories had a central drive shaft, off of which pulleys were attached to power the machinery. The floors were supported by turned wood columns. The wooden window sashes pivoted such that the top third pivoted inward and the bottom two-thirds pivoted about its center so they could be left open even during rain. The new and old halves of the building were separated by firewalls and a central staircase and elevator.

After the 1991 fire, all that remains of the mill complex is the riveted steel water tower.

Mill village
In 1892, the Huntsville Land Company was formed by some of the mill executives to construct homes to house the mill workers and their families.  By 1916 the village consisted of 120 houses and 74 tenement buildings, before reaching a peak of 350 houses. Most of the homes in the village were sold to workers in the mid-1940s.

Rison School, named for mill general manager Archie L. Rison, was built in 1921. The school stood on the corner of Dallas Street and Oakwood Avenue, and grew through the years to serve grades 1–12. It became a part of the Huntsville City Schools system and operated as an elementary and middle school until 1967.  Dallas Park (today known as Optimist Park) was built in 1928, and was the home to semi-professional baseball teams sponsored by the mill. The local Optimist Club purchased the park in 1949.

The mill village extends from Oakwood Avenue south to Pratt Avenue, and from Andrew Jackson Way west to Dallas Avenue. The village was listed on the National Register of Historic Places in 2011.

The records of the Dallas Manufacturing Company are located at Special Collections and Archives at the University of Alabama in Huntsville.

References

Further reading
 Map and inventory of properties of the Dallas Mill Village at the Huntsville History Collection
 : Alabama Review, Apr 2001 by Joyce M Smith - When the Yankees come to Huntsville, again, and again, and again ...
 Vintage photos & film - Dallas Mill fire destroyed Huntsville mill village history 24 years ago today
 Dallas Manufacturing Company Collection The University of Alabama in Huntsville Archives and Special Collections

External links

 

Textile mills in Huntsville, Alabama
Italianate architecture in Alabama
Industrial buildings completed in 1892
National Register of Historic Places in Huntsville, Alabama
Historic districts in Huntsville, Alabama
Cotton mills in the United States
Defunct manufacturing companies based in Alabama